The Athletics at the 2016 Summer Paralympics – Women's 200 metres T44 event at the 2016 Paralympic Games took place on 15 September 2016, at the Estádio Olímpico João Havelange.

Heats

Heat 1 
19:38 14 September 2016:

Heat 2 
19:45 14 September 2016:

Final 
17:45 15 September 2016:

Notes

Athletics at the 2016 Summer Paralympics